Yosuke Eto (born 10 May 1934) is a Japanese ski jumper. He competed at the 1960 Winter Olympics and the 1964 Winter Olympics.

References

1934 births
Living people
Japanese male ski jumpers
Japanese male Nordic combined skiers
Olympic ski jumpers of Japan
Olympic Nordic combined skiers of Japan
Ski jumpers at the 1960 Winter Olympics
Ski jumpers at the 1964 Winter Olympics
Nordic combined skiers at the 1960 Winter Olympics
Sportspeople from Nagano Prefecture